Comet Giacobini–Zinner (officially designated 21P/Giacobini–Zinner) is a periodic comet in the Solar System. It was discovered by Michel Giacobini, who observed it in the constellation  of Aquarius on December 20, 1900. It was recovered two orbits later by Ernst Zinner, while he was observing variable stars near Beta Scuti on October 23, 1913.

The comet nucleus is estimated to be 2.0 kilometers in diameter. During its apparitions, Giacobini–Zinner can reach about the 7-8th magnitude, but in 1946 it underwent a series of outbursts that made it as bright as 5th magnitude. It is the parent body of the Giacobinids meteor shower (also known as the Draconids).

Giacobini–Zinner was the target of the International Cometary Explorer spacecraft, which passed through its plasma tail on September 11, 1985. Earlier in the same month the comet was observed by the Pioneer Venus Orbiter  In addition, Japanese space officials considered redirecting the Sakigake interplanetary probe toward a 1998 encounter with Giacobini–Zinner, but that probe lacked the propellant for the necessary maneuvers and the project was abandoned.

During the apparition of 2018, the optical spectra have revealed the comet is depleted in carbon-chain molecules and carbon dioxide, likely indicating its origin in relatively warm portion of the Solar system.

References

External links 
 Orbital simulation from JPL (Java) / Horizons Ephemeris
 21P/Giacobini-Zinner – Seiichi Yoshida @ aerith.net
 21P at Kronk's Cometography
 Comet 21P - Comet Watch

Comets visited by spacecraft
Periodic comets
0021
021P
Meteor shower progenitors
Comets in 2012
Comets in 2018
19001220